In Philippine media, a love team (or loveteam) is an actor and actress depicted to the public as a romantic couple. Some of these onscreen pairs have become couples in real life.

Background

The concept of love teams can be traced back to the early years of Philippine cinema in the 1920s.The tandem of Gregorio Fernandez and Mary Walter who starred in silent films in the country during the 1920s is considered as the precursor of the love team concept in Philippine cinema. Other pairings became prominent such as Rogelio dela Rosa and Carmen Rosales in the 1950s, Tirso Cruz III and Nora Aunor in the 1960s and the 1970s, Gabby Concepcion and Sharon Cuneta in the 1980s, the pairings of Rico Yan and Claudine Barretto and Marvin Agustin and Jolina Magdangal in the 1990s, and John Lloyd Cruz and Bea Alonzo in the 2000s.

In the 21st century, love teams are also known by the portmanteaus of the couple's names. Becoming part of a love team in the Philippine entertainment industry can be a boost to the acting career of two people who are part of the pairing.

The two people in a love team often star in television series and films with their characters. It is expected that their characters will be romantically attached like in line with their public image as a romantic couple off-screen. There are some organized fan groups supporting love teams. However, prospects of an actor or actress involved in a love team, especially the more popular pairings, to star with another actor or actress other than each other is limited. In cases where this happens, there is backlash from supporters of a love team, such as the case of Kathryn Bernardo's involvement in the 2019 film Hello, Love, Goodbye, where her character got paired with the Alden Richard's. Her pairing with Richards was not received well by KathNiel fans who support her being with Daniel Padilla instead. In that year, both Bernardo and Padilla mutually decided not to be involved in the same film project together.

Hardcore fans of love teams wish for the pairing they support to become a "real-life couple." One example of this is Gabby Concepcion and Sharon Cuneta, who eventually got married. However, their marriage later got annulled.

Traditionally, the "success" of love teams is influenced by the "real-life relationship" between the pairing members. However, love teams could involve actors and actresses who are not romantically in a relationship with each other, with even both members of the pair having open relationship with someone outside the pairing such as the case of Ruru Madrid and Shaira Diaz both of which are dating other people. In the case of Richard Yap and Jodi Sta. Maria, Yap is already married when his love team with Sta. Maria is active. Sta. Maria herself, who separated from her husband, is not in a romantic relationship with Yap.

Reception

Within the entertainment industry
Actress Solenn Heussaff after conversing with people she knows are involved in love teams, said that being in such a pairing is difficult. She remarked that the love teams may "lose a sense of who they are" by trying too hard to portray themselves as romantic couples both on-screen and in real life, which she says is not good if it is forced in the case of the latter. She also points out that love team fans may be limiting the career options of actors involved in a pairing "knowingly or unknowingly." Heussaff states that if an actor or actress gets an assignment for a film or television series where they pair with an actor or actress other than each other as their love interest, "someone gets attacked." But she was quick to add that love teams could be beneficial. Sometimes, those involved in such pairing became romantic couples in reality and urged fans to respect the individuality of the actors and actresses.

Notable examples

See also
Supercouple
Shipping (fandom)

References

External links

Philippine popular culture
Cinema of the Philippines
Television in the Philippines
Entertainer duos
Television terminology
Film and video terminology